The 2013 Nebraska Danger season was the third season for the Nebraska Danger as a football franchise and their third in the Indoor Football League. One of just nine teams competing in the IFL for the 2013 season, the Nebraska Danger are members of the Intense Conference. The team played their home games under head coach Mike Davis at the Eihusen Arena in Grand Island, Nebraska.

Season summary
The Danger were successful in the regular season, clinching the Intense Conference and qualifying for the IFL playoffs. The team defeated the Colorado Ice to win the Intense Conference and reach the United Bowl but fell in the championship game to the Sioux Falls Storm 40-43.

The Danger were named the IFL Franchise of the Year for 2013. Quarterback Jameel Sewell was named both the IFL's Most Valuable Player and its Offensive Player of the Year.

Off-field moves
Shortly before the 2013 season began, the owner of the Cheyenne Warriors died which forced that team to suspend operations and the IFL to revise its schedule to accommodate the now 9-team league.

Schedule
Key:

Preseason

Regular season
All start times are local

Postseason

Roster

Standings

References

External links
 Nebraska Danger official website
 Nebraska Danger official statistics
 2013 IFL regular season schedule
 Nebraska Danger at The Grand Island Independent

Nebraska Danger
Nebraska Danger
Dang